Frank Eugene Bowerman (December 5, 1868 – November 30, 1948) was an American catcher and manager in Major League Baseball with the Baltimore Orioles, the Pittsburgh Pirates, the New York Giants, and the Boston Doves, as well as a player-manager for the Doves in his last season in professional baseball. He was also the first to catch Hall-of-Famer Christy Mathewson.

Bowerman was known for having a short fuse, as he repeatedly got into fights with players, umpires, and fans. He also started a fight with manager Fred Clarke while with the Pirates and gave him a black eye.

The Doves hired him as manager during the  season, but his fiery temper did not go well with his team, and he was relegated to player-only status after only 76 games.

In 1037 games over 15 seasons, Bowerman posted a .250 batting average (853-for-3410) with 345 runs, 13 home runs, 393 RBI and 81 stolen bases. He finished his career with a .965 fielding percentage.

Bowerman died in his birthplace of Romeo, Michigan five days shy of his 80th birthday.

See also
List of Major League Baseball player–managers

External links

The Deadball Era

1868 births
1948 deaths
Sportspeople from Metro Detroit
Baseball players from Michigan
Major League Baseball catchers
Baltimore Orioles (NL) players
Pittsburgh Pirates players
New York Giants (NL) players
Boston Doves players
Boston Doves managers
Major League Baseball player-managers
Michigan Wolverines baseball players
People from Romeo, Michigan
Minor league baseball managers
Detroit Creams players
Twin Cities Hustlers players
Scranton Miners players
Norfolk Braves players
Indianapolis Indians players
Kansas City Blues (baseball) players
19th-century baseball players